The Tower of the Elephant is a 1975 collection of two fantasy short stories by  American writer Robert E. Howard featuring his sword and sorcery hero Conan the Barbarian.  The book was published in 1975 by Donald M. Grant, Publisher, Inc. as the third volume of their deluxe Conan set.  The title story originally appeared in the magazine Weird Tales.  "The God in the Bowl"  is the original version of the story that first appeared, edited by L. Sprague de Camp, in the magazine Space Science Fiction.

Contents
 "The Tower of the Elephant"
 "The God in the Bowl"

Sources

External links 

1975 short story collections
Fantasy short story collections
Conan the Barbarian books
Donald M. Grant, Publisher books